Revue virtuelle (1992–1996) was an exhibition project for early new media, virtual art technologies, computer graphics, virtual reality, hypermedia and digital art projects that was housed in the Musée National d'Art Moderne, Centre Pompidou from1992 to 1996.

It also created a virtual "magazine" jointly created by the museum and the Centre de Création Industrielle, addressing new technologies from the viewpoints of science, aesthetics, museography and education. These activities were documented in a bilingual CD-ROM, L'Actualité du Virtuel/Actualizing the Virtual, published in 1996.

Revue virtuelle history
Number 1: Definitions
Lecture: Edmond Couchot - 15 April 1992

Number 2-3: Anthologies
Exhibition: 17 June - 11 October 1992
Lecture: Anne-Marie Duguet - 23 September 1992

Number 4: Real-Virtual
Exhibition: 9 December 1992 - 24 January 1993
Lecture: Scott S Fisher - 9 December 1992

Number 5: Images évolutives
Exhibition: 3 March - 2 May 1993
Lecture: Karl Sims - 4 March 1993

Numbers 6-7: The Virtual in Questions
Exhibition: 2 June - 19 September 1993
Lecture: Derrick de Kerckhove - 3 June 1993

Number 8: The Digital Herbarium
Exhibition: 13 October 1993 - 2 January 1994
Lecture: Philippe de Reffye - 13 October 1993

Number 9: The Virtual Body
Exhibition: 2 March - 2 May 1994
Lecture: Dr. Karl Heinz Höhne - 7 April 1994

Numbers 10-11: The Art of Games
Exhibition: 6 July - 26 September 1994
Lecture: Alain Le Diberder, Matt Mullican, Florian Rötzer - 14 September 1994

Number 12: The Hypermedia
Exhibition: 9 November 1994 - 23 January 1995
Lecture: George Legrady, Pierre Lévy, Nam June Paik - 9 November 1994

Number 13: Networks as Spaces for Writing
Lecture: Friedrich Kittler, Geert Lovink - 31 May 1995

Number 14: Architecture and Interactivity
Lecture: Elizabeth Diller and Ricardo Scofido - 18 October 1995

Number 15: Virtuality and Subjectivity
Lecture: Siegfried Zielinski, Knowbotic Research (Christian Hübler and Yvonne Wilhelm) - 31 January 1996

Number 16: Digital Arts and Digital Media
Lecture: Jean-Marie Schaeffer - 23 February 1996

Number 17: The InterCommunication Center Project (Tokyo)
Lecture: Akira Asada, Toshiharu Itoh - 24 June 1996

See also
 New media
 New media art

References 

New media art
Defunct art museums and galleries in Paris
Arts centres in France
Contemporary art galleries in France
1992 establishments in France
1996 disestablishments in France